The Global Climate and Health Alliance (GCHA) is an organisation, whose members are health professionals and institutes from around the world, with the purpose of tackling climate change to protect and promote public health. It was formed in 2011 in Durban and by 2015 had admitted over 1,700 health organisations and 8,200 hospitals and health facilities as members, and gathered 13 million signatures from its members in a collective agreement on the need to address climate change.

References

External links

Organizations established in 2011
Environmental health
Environmental health organizations
Climate change organizations